The women's kumite +68 kg competition in karate at the 2017 World Games took place on 26 July 2017 at the GEM Sports Complex in Wrocław, Poland.

Results

Elimination round

Group A

Group B

Finals
{{#invoke:RoundN|N4
|widescore=yes|bold_winner=high|team-width=200
|RD1=Semifinals
|3rdplace=yes

||{{flagIOC2athlete|Hamideh Abbasali|IRI|2017 World Games}}|5||1
||{{flagIOC2athlete|Ayumi Uekusa|JPN|2017 World Games}}|0||0

|||0|{{flagIOC2athlete|Ayumi Uekusa|JPN|2017 World Games}}|0

||

References

Karate at the 2017 World Games
2017 World Games
2017 in women's karate